Rodasar is a town located in the Punjab province of Pakistan. It is located in Lahore District at 31°19'0N 73°4'0E with an altitude of 172 metres (567 feet) and lies near to the city of Lahore. Neighbouring settlements include Hari Singwala to the north and Bismillapur to the south.

References

Populated places in Lahore District